This is a list of the crossings of the Charles River from its mouth at Boston Harbor upstream to its source at Echo Lake (the four tunnels crossing the inner portion of Boston Harbor are not included).  All locations are in Massachusetts.



Crossings

Source: Echo Lake

See also

Charles River Bridge v. Warren Bridge

Notes

References

External links

 Map of local Charles River crossings – Harvard College Marathon Challenge website
Articles on crossings and their conservation in Newton

Charles River crossings

Charles River
Charles River crossings